Yeongdong Bridge is a bridge over the Han River in Seoul, South Korea. The bridge links the Gwangjin and Seongdong districts north of the river to Gangnam district. It was opened on November 8, 1973.

This bridge should not be confused with Yeongdong region or Yeongdong County, or Yeongdong Expressway.

References

Bridges in Seoul
Bridges completed in 1973